The Las Vegas Raiders are a professional American football team based in Paradise, Nevada. They are a member of the American Football Conference West Division (AFC West). The team began play in 1960 as a charter member of the American Football League, which merged with the National Football League in 1970. In 1982, the team relocated to Los Angeles, where they remained until the franchise returned to Oakland in 1995, where they remained until 2019 when they once again relocated to the Las Vegas area. The franchise has selected 61 players in the first round, one of these being the first overall pick.  

The NFL Draft, which is officially known as the "Player Selection Meeting", is held each April. The draft is used as the primary means to distribute newly available talent (primarily from college football) equitably amongst the teams. Selections are made in reverse order based on the previous season's record, i.e., the club with the worst record from the previous season selects first. Through 2009, only two exceptions were made to this order: the Super Bowl champion always selects last (32nd), and the Super Bowl loser second to last (31st). Beginning in 2010, teams making the playoffs have been seeded in reverse order depending upon how far they advance. The draft consists of seven rounds. Teams have the option of trading selections for players, cash and/or other selections (including future year selections). Thus, it is not uncommon for a team's actual draft pick to differ from their assigned draft pick, or for a team to have extra or no draft picks in any round due to these trades.

The Raiders have selected first once. They have also selected the second overall pick twice. The Ohio State University and the Alabama University have the most players chosen by the Raiders from one university, with five selections each.

Key

Player selections

References

General

Specific

Las Vegas Raiders

first-round draft picks